Ulma or ULMA may refer to:
 United Lutheran Mission Association (ULMA)

Place names 
 Latin and Italian name of the German city Ulm
 Ulma, Amur Oblast, a rural locality in Amur Oblast, Russia
 Ulma (river), Amur Oblast, Russia
 Ulma, Iran (disambiguation), places in Iran
 Ulma, Suceava, a commune in Romania

People with the surname
 Józef and Wiktoria Ulma, Polish Righteous among the Nations

See also 
 Ulm (disambiguation)
 Ulmer
 Ulam (disambiguation)